Thomas Westbrook Waldron was a captain's clerk on the Wilkes Expedition, and the first United States consul  to Hong Kong.  His service to the United States consular service was honoured by Secretary of State Hillary Clinton during a ceremony in 2009.

Family
Waldron was born May 1, 1814, the youngest of eight children of Daniel Waldron and Olive Huske Sheafe Waldron of Dover, New Hampshire. He was named after his grandfather, Thomas Westbrook Waldron.  An older cousin of the same name had moved away prior to his birth.

Wilkes Expedition
With his oldest brother Richard Russell Waldron he joined the Wilkes Expedition which explored a portion of the coast of Antarctica, some of the Pacific islands, and the coast of what is now Washington state.  Waldron Glacier in the Antarctic is named after him.  Waldron Island is named after him or his brother.

U.S. Consul to Hong Kong and Macau
For reasons that are not presently very clear, in December 1843 he was nominated by President John Tyler to the office of United States consul to Hong Kong.  He travelled to neighbouring Macau on official business, where he died September 18, 1844 after contracting cholera.  He is buried in the Old Protestant Cemetery in Macau.

2009 Ceremony
On May 1, 2009, as part of a ceremony honouring several diplomats who were deceased during their duty, he was honoured by Secretary of State Hillary Rodham Clinton.  A second ceremony occurred the same month at his burial site at Old Protestant Cemetery, Macau.

Landmarks
Waldron Glacier, is named after him.  Waldron Island in the San Juan Islands off of Puget Sound is named either after he or his brother Richard.

References

American oceanographers
History of science and technology in the United States
Pacific Ocean
History of the United States Navy
Military expeditions of the United States
1838 in the United States
1839 in Antarctica
Circumnavigators of the globe
Battles involving the United States
Artifacts in the collection of the Smithsonian Institution
Exploration of North America
History of Hong Kong
1814 births
1844 deaths
People of the United States Exploring Expedition